Demokratizatsiya: The Journal of Post-Soviet Democratization is a quarterly peer-reviewed academic journal established in 1992 covering the changes in the late Soviet Union and post-Soviet states since 1985. It was established by Fredo Arias-King.

Demokratizatsiya is the Russian for "democratization".

References

External links
 

Political science journals
Publications established in 1992
Quarterly journals
English-language journals
George Washington University